Russell Powell may refer to:

 Russ Powell (1875–1950), American film actor
 Russell Powell (baseball) (1893–?), Negro Leagues catcher